Melanie Anderson Blunt is the wife of former Missouri Governor Matt Blunt, serving as First Lady of Missouri from 2005 to 2009.

During that period, she was the youngest spouse of a U.S. state governor in the United States. She was succeeded as First Lady by Georganne W. Nixon, the wife of Governor Jay Nixon, on January 12, 2009.

Early life
Melanie Anderson was born in Middleburg, Virginia in Loudoun County and attended James Madison University in Harrisonburg, Virginia, where she graduated summa cum laude with a Bachelor of Science in Fashion Merchandising. After college, she managed retail stores for The Limited and Talbots and met Matt Blunt during his active service in the U.S. Navy. They were married in 1997 and moved to her husband's hometown of Springfield, Missouri.

Their first son, William Branch Blunt, was born in March 2005, two months after his father took office as Governor. Their second son, Brooks Anderson Blunt, was born on January 1, 2010.

Historic preservation efforts
Blunt led an initiative to restore the Missouri Governor's Mansion, a Renaissance Revival-style home designed by St. Louis architect George Ingham Barnett and completed in 1871.

Blunt's efforts included successfully lobbying the General Assembly for $3.1 million in funding, as well as hosting a luncheon with the First Ladies, the first-ever event to bring together Missouri's First Ladies for a common cause.

Charitable works
Blunt served as honorary chair of Missouri Citizens for the Arts from 2007 to 2008. She has also taken active leadership roles in Habitat for Humanity and Susan G. Komen Race for the Cure.

References

Year of birth missing (living people)
Living people
People from Middleburg, Virginia
First Ladies and Gentlemen of Missouri
People from Springfield, Missouri
Missouri Republicans
James Madison University alumni